A workers' council or labor council is a form of political and economic organization in which a workplace or municipality is governed by a council made up of workers or their elected delegates, the latter of which can be recalled at any time. In such a system, the workers themselves are able to exercise decision-making power. The workers within each council decide on what their agenda is and what their needs are. The council communist Antonie Pannekoek describes shop-committees and sectional assemblies as the basis for workers' management of the  industrial system. A variation is a soldiers' council, where soldiers direct a mutiny. Workers and soldiers have also operated councils in conjunction (like the 1918 German Arbeiter- und Soldatenrat). Workers' councils may in turn elect delegates to central committees, such as the Congress of Soviets.

Supporters of workers' councils argue that they are the most natural form of working-class organization. Some socialists believe that workers' councils are necessary for the organization of a proletarian revolution and the implementation of a communist society. In 1917, councils such as the Petrograd Soviet were formed by striking workers to coordinate the Russian Revolution, exercising political power in the absence of the Czar's governance. In the workers' councils organized as part of the 1918 German revolution, factory organizations such as the General Workers' Union of Germany formed the basis for region-wide councils. A works council is distinct from a workers' council in that it is organized by a firm to assist with shop-floor management, rather than organizing a socialist revolution. These organizations exist on a legal basis and are common among businesses in Germany. The term has also been applied to unions such as the Nigeria Workers' Council, and political factions such as the Workers' Council of the United States.

Anarchism 

Anarchists advocate for the use of workers' councils and voluntary associations as the basic units of a stateless society. Anarchists propose horizontal social organisation through voluntary federations of communes. French mutualist philosopher Pierre-Joseph Proudhon advocated for this form of organisation as an alternative to all forms of statehood. In his book The Conquest of Bread, Russian anarchist theorist Peter Kropotkin advocated for horizontal networks of workers' councils to organise stateless societies based on the principles of anarcho-communism. He also hinted at the use of workers' councils for organising a future anarchist revolution in his work on the French Revolution.

During the Russian Revolution, the Revolutionary Insurgent Army of Ukraine led by Nestor Makhno established a stateless territory in Eastern Ukraine on the principles of workers' self management. The Makhnovists established a system of free soviets, which allowed workers, peasants, and militants to self-govern their communities and send delegates to the Regional Congress of Peasants, Workers and Insurgents.

The Spanish Revolution of 1936 saw the creation of anarchist communes across much of Spain. These communes operated under the principle "From each according to his ability to each according to his needs". Decision-making in the communes were conducted through workers' councils. As a result of this form of organisation, and the collectivisation of industries, production saw an increase in terms of efficiency and there was a 20% increase in productivity.

Marxism

Leninism 

Marxist revolutionary Vladimir Lenin, in his book The State and Revolution, proposed that the dictatorship of the proletariat should come in the form of a soviet republic. He proposed that the revolutionary party should seize state power and establish a socialist state based on soviet democracy.

Despite Lenin's declarations that "the workers must demand the immediate establishment of genuine control, to be exercised by the workers themselves", on May 30, the Menshevik minister of labor, Matvey Skobelev, pledged to not give the control of industry to the workers but instead to the state: "The transfer of enterprises into the hands of the people will not at the present time assist the revolution [...] The regulation and control of industry is not a matter for a particular class. It is a task for the state. Upon the individual class, especially the working class, lies the responsibility for helping the state in its organizational work." Council communists criticize the Bolsheviks for superseding the soviet democracy formed by the councils and creating a bureaucratic system of state capitalism.

Council Communism 

Council Communism is a libertarian Marxist school of thought that advocates for a system of workers councils, as opposed to a Communist party or trade union, to coordinate class struggle. Workers directly control production and construct higher organizational bodies from below. Recall-able delegates can be elected from individual workplaces to represent workers on a societal level. Council communists, such as the Dutch-German current of left communists, believe that their nature means that workers' councils do away with bureaucratic form of the state and instead give power directly to workers through a soviet democracy. Council communists view this organization of a revolutionary government as an anti-authoritarian approach to the dictatorship of the proletariat.

The council communists in the Communist Workers' Party of Germany advocated organizing "on the basis of places of work, not trades, and to establish a National Federation of Works Committees." The Central Workers Council of Greater Budapest occupied this role in the Hungarian Revolution of 1956, between late October and early January 1957, where it grew out of local factory committees.

Historical examples 
Workers' councils have played a significant role in the communist revolutions of the 20th century. They originated in lands of the Russian Empire (including Congress Poland and Latvia) in 1905, with the workers' councils (soviets) acting as labor committees which coordinated strike activities throughout the cities due to repression of trade unions. During the Revolutions of 1917–1923, councils of socialist workers were able to exercise political authority. Communists such as Anton Pannekoek and Rosa Luxemburg advocated for the control of the revolution by the workers' councils. Several times in recent history, the socialists have organized workers' councils during periods of unrest. Examples include:
Paris, France during 1871
Adrianople Vilayet, Ottoman Empire in 1903
Russia in 1905 and during 1917-1921 (soviets);
Poland during 1905, 1918–1919, 1944–1947 and 1956, 1970, 1980–1981;
Mexico during 1910–1920, 1994–present and 2011;
Glasgow, Scotland during 1915
Austria during 1918
Finland during the 1918 (Central Workers' Council of Finland)
Germany during 1918–1919;
Ukraine during 1918–1921 ("free soviets");
Hungary during 1919 and 1956;
Italy during 1919–1920 and 1968;
Ireland during 1920–1921;
China during 1920–1927, in 1967, and in 1989;
Korea during 1929–1931 and 1945–1946 ;
Spain during 1934 and 1936–1937;
Indonesia during 1945–1946
Vietnam during 1930-1931 and 1945
Algeria during 1962–1965
France during 1968;
Czechoslovakia in 1968 ;
Sri Lanka during the 1970–75 United Front government 
Australia during 1971–1980 and 1990
Chile during 1973;
Argentina during 1973 and 2001
Northern Ireland during 1974
Portugal during 1974–1976
Iran during 1978–1979;
Canada during 1981
Rojava from 2012 onward

See also 

Anarchism
Antonie Pannekoek
The Civil War in France
Co-determination
Council communism
Kronstadt rebellion
Factory committee
Free association of producers
Guild socialism
Libertarian socialism
Marxism
Paris Commune
Rosa Luxemburg
Soviet democracy
Soviet republic (system of government)
Soviet (council)
Supreme Soviet
Works council
Workers' control
Workers' self-management
Workers' Council of the United States

References

External links 
Workers' Councils: The historically discovered form of the dictatorship of the proletariat
Workers' Councils, Anton Pannekoek

Workers' rights organizations
Types of organization
Socialism
Anti-capitalism
Marxism